Theodoros Gitkos (born 12 January 1974) is a retired Greek football goalkeeper.

References

1974 births
Living people
Greek footballers
Veria F.C. players
Ionikos F.C. players
PAS Giannina F.C. players
Aris Thessaloniki F.C. players
A.O. Kerkyra players
Niki Volos F.C. players
Ethnikos Asteras F.C. players
Olympiacos Volos F.C. players
Lefkadia F.C. players
Super League Greece players
Association football goalkeepers
Footballers from Trikala